was a town located in Iishi District, Shimane Prefecture, Japan.

As of 2003, the town had an estimated population of 3,783 and a density of 34.55 per km2. The total area was 

On November 1, 2004, Kakeya, along with the towns of Daito, Kamo and Kisuki (all from Ōhara District), the town of Mitoya, and the village of Yoshida (all from Iishi District), was merged to create the city of Unnan.

Notable residents 

 Prime Minister Noboru Takeshita (1924-2000)

References 

Dissolved municipalities of Shimane Prefecture